Heosphora enervella is a species of moth in the family Pyralidae. The species was first described by George Hampson in 1901.

References 

Pyralidae
Moths of Australia
Moths described in 1901